WIOV may refer to:

 WIOV (AM), a radio station (1240 AM) licensed to Reading, Pennsylvania, United States
 WIOV-FM, a radio station (105.1 FM) licensed to Ephrata, Pennsylvania, United States